1987 earthquake may refer to:

1987 Ecuador earthquakes
1987 Edgecumbe earthquake (New Zealand)
1987 Santiago de Chuco earthquake (Peru)
1987 Whittier Narrows earthquake (Los Angeles, California, US)